Christian Petzold is an internationally acclaimed German film director, best known for directing the films Barbara, Jerichow, and Phoenix.

Early life and education 
Born in Hilden and raised in Haan, where he graduated from high school in 1979, Petzold fulfilled his military civil service in a small cinema club of a local YMCA, showing films to troubled adolescents. From 1981 on he lived in Berlin, where he studied theatre and German studies at the Free University of Berlin. From 1988-1994, he studied film at the German Film and Television Academy Berlin (dffb) where he studied with mentors who "included filmmakers, media artists, and media theorists Harun Farocki and Hartmut Bitomsky, who are both known for their non-narrative films, video work, and film installations in galleries and museums." While at dffb, Petzold appeared in Thomas Arslan's short experimental film 19 Porträts (1990), a 16-millimeter black-and-white film in the tradition of Andy Warhol's Screen Tests.

Career
His first film was Pilotinnen, which he directed for his film school graduation in 1995. While The State I Am In (German: Die innere Sicherheit) (2000) was his first feature film, also noting his first collaboration with Harun Farocki. In 2005, his film Gespenster was presented at the Berlin International Film Festival, as was his 2007 film Yella. Petzold writes his own scenarios, often collaborating with Harun Farocki. As his former teacher at dffb, Farocki was a major influence on Petzold, who, along with Angela Schanelec and Thomas Arslan, is generally considered to be part of the Berlin School.

While the Berlin School is often associated with a new turn towards realism and political cinema, Petzold's films, while they address issues of work and employment, also deal with conflicts between life and death.  In Gespenster the protagonist leads a ghost-like existence. In Yella the protagonist is, possibly, already dead at the beginning of the film. These three films came to be called the "Gespenster Trilogy".

The 2008 film Jerichow was his fourth collaboration with Nina Hoss after Something to Remind Me (German: Toter Mann), Wolfsburg and Yella. The drama concerns a soldier who, having returned from Afghanistan to Prignitz, becomes involved in a relationship with a married woman. The movie was nominated in the main competition at the 65th Venice International Film Festival in 2008. In 2009, Petzold received a 'best director' nomination for the Deutscher Filmpreis award.

Although more famous as a director of film and television, Petzold has also staged Arthur Schnitzler's The Lonely Way (German: Der einsame Weg) at the Deutsches Theater following an invitation by Oliver Reese. The drama, with Nina Hoss as protagonist, premiered on March 14, 2009.

Petzold's film Barbara competed in competition at the 62nd Berlin International Film Festival and Petzold won the Silver Bear for Best Director. The film was selected as the German entry for the Best Foreign Language Oscar at the 85th Academy Awards, but it did not make the final shortlist. The film became Petzold's greatest box office success, grossing $4,129,250 worldwide.

Awards 

 1996: Max Ophüls assistance award in category feature-length film for Cuba Libre
 2001: Preis der deutschen Filmkritik for The State I Am In
 2001: German Film Award in category best movie for The State I Am In
 2002: Academy of Arts, Berlin, television award for Something to Remind Me
 2002: Deutscher Fernsehpreis for Something to Remind Me
 2003: Adolf Grimme Award for Something to Remind Me
 2003: FIPRESCI award in panorama of Internationale Filmfestspiele Berlin for Wolfsburg
 2005: Adolf Grimme golden award for Wolfsburg
 2005: Findling Award for Gespenster
 2006: Preis der deutschen Filmkritik for Gespenster
 2008: Preis der deutschen Filmkritik for Yella
 2009: Preis der deutschen Filmkritik for Jerichow
 2009: Film award of German city Hof (Saale) (Hof International Film Festival)
 2012: Silver Bear for Best Director of Internationale Filmfestspiele Berlin for Barbara
 2012: Preis der deutschen Filmkritik for Barbara
 2021: Officers Cross of the Order of Merit of the Federal Republic of Germany
 2023: Silver Bear Grand Jury Prize for Afire

Filmography 

Short films:
 1988: Ich Arbeite Alles Ab... Ehrenwort! (experimentalfilm)
 1989: Weiber (spielfilm)
 1989-1990: Süden (dokumentarfilm)
 1990: Ostwärts (dokumentarfilm)
 1992: Das Warme Geld (spielfilm)
Television films:
 1994-1995: Pilotinnen (With Eleonore Weisgerber, Nadeshda Brennicke, Udo Schenk, Annedore von Donop, Barbara Frey)
 1996:  (With Richy Müller, Marquard Bohm, Eleonore Weisgerber)
 1998:  (German: Die Beischlafdiebin) (With Constanze Engelbrecht, Richy Müller, Wolfram Berger)
 2002: Something to Remind Me (German: Toter Mann) (Scenario Jean-Baptiste Filleau, with Nina Hoss, André Hennicke, Sven Pippig, Kathrin Angerer)
 2011: Dreileben – Beats Being Dead (part of the Dreileben trilogy, made in collaboration with directors Dominik Graf and Christoph Hochhäusler)
 2015: Kreise (part of the Polizeiruf 110 Season 44 Episode 3)
 2016: Wölfe (part of the Polizeiruf 110 Season 45 Episode 4)
Feature films:
 2000: The State I Am In (German: Die innere Sicherheit) (scenario with Harun Farocki, with Julia Hummer, Richy Müller, Barbara Auer, Katharina Schüttler)
 2003: Wolfsburg (with Benno Fürmann, Nina Hoss, Astrid Meyerfeldt)
 2005: Gespenster (scenario with Harun Farocki, with Julia Hummer, Sabine Timoteo, Benno Fürmann)
 2007: Yella (scenario with Simone Baer, with Nina Hoss)
 2008: Jerichow (with Nina Hoss, Hilmi Sözer and Benno Fürmann)
 2012: Barbara (with Nina Hoss and Ronald Zehrfeld)
 2014: Phoenix (with Nina Hoss and Ronald Zehrfeld)
 2018: Transit (with Paula Beer and Franz Rogowski)
 2020: Undine (with Paula Beer and Franz Rogowski)
 2023: Afire (with Thomas Schubert and Paula Beer)

References

External links 
 
 'The Cinema of Identification Gets on My Nerves': An Interview with Christian Petzold, Cineaste 33.3 (summer 2008)

1960 births
Living people
Silver Bear for Best Director recipients
Mass media people from North Rhine-Westphalia
People from Haan
Members of the Academy of Arts, Berlin
Officers Crosses of the Order of Merit of the Federal Republic of Germany